Horatio School District 55 is a school district in Sevier County, Arkansas, United States. It serves Horatio and Winthrop. It operates Horatio Elementary School and Horatio High School.

On July 1, 1992, the Winthrop School District consolidated into the Horatio district.

References

Further reading
  (Download)

External links
 
 
School districts in Arkansas
Education in Sevier County, Arkansas